Universal Eclectic Wicca (UEW) is one of a number of distinctly American Wiccan traditions which developed following the introduction of Gardnerian and Alexandrian Wicca to the United States in the early 1960s. Its corporate body is the Church of Universal Eclectic Wicca (CUEW) which is incorporated and based in Great Falls, Virginia.

It is particularly noted for its early Internet teaching coven – the Coven of the Far Flung Net (CFFN), and for its inclusive approach to solitary as well as coven based practitioners.

History

Silver Chalice Wicca
What was to become UEW began, in 1969, as the core coven associated with the Silver Chalice Land Trust; an intentional community  based in Westchester, New York.

Silver Chalice had a diverse membership drawing from both Dianic and British Traditional Wiccan backgrounds. It was partly as a response to this diversity, as well as a perceived need for reform in Wicca, that their High Priestess, Jayne Tomas, began to create a body of liturgy for Silver Chalice Wicca as a distinct tradition.

A defining text is the Ordains of Silver Chalice, which may be seen as an attempt to refer to, and move away from, the Old Laws of Gardnerian Wicca.  Together with the Fifteen Creeds of Silver Chalice Wicca (1969) they emphasized modernism; democratic principles; historical, intellectual and personal integrity; race and gender equality; self-determination; and engagement with society.

Change of name
By 1986 the land held by the Silver Chalice Land Trust was sold, and all the covens that originated with Silver Chalice were referred to as Universal Eclectic Wicca.

'Universal' because "Wicca is universal because it can be used by all, and anything can be used in Wicca"; and 'Eclectic' because "UEW is based not on one or two sources, but an infinite number of sources".

On-line teaching covens
In 1997 UEW chartered the Coven of the Far Flung Net (CFFN), which began operating in January of the following year; and which it maintains was the first on-line teaching coven. UEW has two other on-line teaching groups, the Coven of Non-Fluffy Wicca (2006), which is aimed at more advanced students with some prior knowledge of Wicca, and Vircle, for Third Circle Studies.

Schisms
In 2004, following a reorganization of CFFN which abolished its then clan structure, one of the dissolved clans, Athames's Edge,  re-established itself to form an independent Progressive Eclectic Wicca tradition.

Later, in 2008, the first Australian UEW coven, Oak and Mistletoe, split away to establish the Inclusive Wicca tradition.

Core beliefs
UEW allows for diverse interpretations of Wiccan practice and belief; provided that a core set of ethical values are observed. These are commonly referred to as the Five Points of Wiccan Belief and the Affirmation of Acknowledgement.

Five Points
The Five Points of Wiccan belief are the Wiccan Rede, the Law of Return, the Ethic of Self-Responsibility, the Ethic of Constant Improvement and the Ethic of Attunement.

Affirmation of Acknowledgement
In addition to the 'Five Points', UEW requires its members to assent to the Affirmation of Acknowledgement, which is intended to inform behavior towards, and interaction with,  those of other faiths.  It states that:

Organization

Types of membership

There are five types of membership recognized in UEW:

Triad
The executive body of CUEW is the three-person Triad.  The Triad is solely responsible for extending or withholding membership of CUEW to both individuals and groups.  Each member of the Triad is responsible for the selection and training of their successor.

Council of Elders
The Triad is advised and assisted by a Council of Elders.  Any Third Circle member may nominate themselves for membership of the Council of Elders.  The Council of Elders annually elects one of their number as Chief Elder.

Association of Universal Eclectic Wicca Clergy
The Association of Universal Eclectic Wicca Clergy (AUEWC), is responsible for the ratification of Ordained Clergy. CUEW covens with eight or more.

References

Wiccan traditions
Religious organizations established in 1969
Wicca in the United States
Wiccan organisations
Modern pagan organizations established in the 1960s